Australia is the world's largest live exporter of animals for slaughter. The trade involved over three million animals in 2011 valued at approximately A$1 billion, of which the majority were cattle and sheep. However, the live export trade only accounts for 0.4% of all Australian exports, .

The export of live animals from Australia has generated some controversy, with animal rights organisations such as Animals Australia asking it to be banned on the grounds that certain countries where animals are shipped have no laws to protect them from cruelty. In 2011, the Gillard government briefly suspended the trade and came close to a ban. Exports have since resumed.

Overview 
Australia exports live animals to many countries, including Indonesia, Egypt, Israel, Turkey, Russia, Lebanon, Jordan, Kuwait, Iran, Bahrain, Qatar, Pakistan, Mauritius, Malaysia, Singapore, Vietnam and China. A number of ships, mostly converted container ships, move animals from Australia to these countries.

Statistics 
In 2011, the Australian Bureau of Statistics estimated that:
 2,458,448 sheep were exported from Australia, worth $328 million
 694,429 cattle were exported, worth $629.4 million
 63,663 goats were exported, worth $8.5 million

According to the Australian Bureau of Statistics, exports of live sheep rose 21.4% and live calves increased 9.7% between March 2017 and March 2018. During 2017 alone, Australia exported 2.85 million living animals in shipping containers and airplanes.

Animal rights controversy 

In March 2011, Animals Australia conducted an investigation of the treatment of exported Australian cattle in Indonesia. The investigation revealed animals had their throats cut while fully conscious and remained conscious for more than 30 seconds after the initial throat cut. This sparked mass protests across Australia calling for the live export trade to be banned.

The sudden decision taking immediate effect by then Agriculture Minister Joe Ludwig in May 2011 to ban live animal exports in response to the negative media coverage resulted in significant disruption to the livestock supply chain across northern Australia. In July 2017, a group of cattle farmers sued the Australian Government for $600m in compensation, arguing that the decision to suspend live cattle exports was "irrational, disproportionate and unjustified". In June 2020, a Federal Court ruled in favour of the group of cattle farmers. In delivering his judgement, Justice Rares said the ban order was "capricious" and "unreasonable."

In September 2012, 20000 sheep were killed when a shipload of animals, rejected by Bahrain due to disease claims were offloaded into Pakistan. The mass slaughter was featured in a four corners program called "Another Bloody Business".

In April 2018, Australian current affairs program, 60 Minutes, revealed the suffering of sheep on Australian live export ships in an exposé called "Sheep, Ships and Videotape." For years, exporters had assured the Australian public the safety and well-being of the sheep was their priority. Because cameras were not allowed on board, this was taken as true — until a Pakistani crew-member turned whistleblower documented the daily horrors onboard export ships, of sheep dehydrating, being crushed and even cooking alive during voyages to the Middle Eastern summer. The evidence of routine, extreme animal cruelty was so horrific that Federal Minister for Agriculture, Mr David Littleproud, called "bullshit" and described how the footage left him "shocked and gutted".

See also 
 Animal welfare and rights in Australia

References

Livestock in Australia
Animal welfare and rights in Australia